Mimosa borealis, the fragrant mimosa or pink mimosa, is a plant in the family Fabaceae. It is found from Oklahoma to Kansas and south-eastern Colorado, south through central and western Texas and New Mexico to Mexico. The habitat consists of rocky hills, canyons and brushy areas. The plant has a height around 3 feet (90 cm). The flowering phase of the plant is between spring to summer.

References

borealis